Charles Ryder may refer to:

 Charles Henry Dudley Ryder (1868–1945), English army officer and explorer who served as Surveyor General of India 
 Charles W. Ryder (1892–1960), United States Army officer who was decorated in both WW1 and WW2

See also
 Brideshead Revisited: the Sacred and Profane Memories of Captain Charles Ryder